Choanocotyle elegans is a species of flatworms in the family Choanocotylidae. It infects Australian freshwater turtles. It was described from the small intestine of Chelodina expansa and Emydura macquarii.

References

External links 

Plagiorchiida
Animals described in 1998
Parasites of reptiles